The James J. and Helen Storrow Memorial is a memorial commemorating James J. Storrow and Helen Storrow, installed along Boston's Charles River Esplanade, in the U.S. state of Massachusetts. Installed in 1948, the memorial features a bronze sculpture on a granite platform with an engraved map of Boston. The couple's only son, James Jackson Storrow III, attended the unveiling ceremony.

References

External links
 

1948 establishments in Massachusetts
1948 sculptures
Bronze sculptures in Massachusetts
Charles River Esplanade
Granite sculptures in Massachusetts
Monuments and memorials in Boston
Outdoor sculptures in Boston